The 2016 Copa del Rey Juvenil was the 66th staging of the Copa del Rey Juvenil de Fútbol. The competition started on May 15, 2016 and finished on June 26, 2016.

First round

The top two teams from each group of the 2015–16 División de Honor Juvenil de Fútbol and the two best third-placed teams were drawn into a two-game best aggregate score series. The first leg will be played on May 15 and the return leg on May 22.

|}

Quarterfinals

The eight winners from the first round advance to quarterfinals, that are played in a two-game series. The first leg will be played on May 28 and 29 and the second leg on June 4 and 5.

|}

Semifinals

The four winners from the quarterfinals advance to semifinals, that are played in a two-game series. The first leg will be played on June 11 and 12 and the second leg on June 18 and 19.

|}

Final

The semifinal winners play a one-game final at the Estadio Son Bibiloni in Palma, Mallorca, Balearic Islands June 26.

Details

See also
2015–16 División de Honor Juvenil de Fútbol

References

Copa del Rey Juvenil de Fútbol
Juvenil